Hundred Gates may refer to:
 Hecatompylos, a capital of the Parthian Empire
 Hundred-Gated Thebes, a city of ancient Egypt
 Meah Shearim, a neighbourhood of Jerusalem, Israel